Alexander County is the southernmost and southwesternmost county in the U.S. state of Illinois. As of the 2020 census, the population was 5,240. Its county seat is Cairo and its western boundary is formed by the Mississippi River.

Alexander County is part of the Cape Girardeau, MO-IL Metropolitan Statistical Area which is made up of jurisdictions on both sides of the Mississippi River.

History
Alexander County was organized from part of Union County in 1819. It was named for William M. Alexander, a physician who practiced in the town of America (the first county seat). Alexander was elected as a representative to the state House, where he became Speaker of the Illinois House of Representatives in 1822.

The county was initially developed for agriculture and settled by numerous migrants from the Upper South. The county seat was moved to Unity in 1833, then to Thebes in 1843, and finally to Cairo in 1860. America, the first county seat, is now within Pulaski County, which was formed from Alexander and Johnson counties in 1843.

Settled largely by white migrants from the Upland South, southern Illinois had many racial attitudes of the South. As African Americans settled in Cairo to seek jobs on steamboats, ferries, in shipping and railroads, there were tensions between the racial groups. White residents sometimes used violence and terrorism, as well as discrimination, to keep black residents in second-class positions. They excluded them from the city government and the police and fire departments, and relatively few African Americans were hired to work in the local stores.

There were three lynchings of blacks in Alexander County in the years between Reconstruction and the early 20th century. The county had the second-highest number of lynchings of African Americans in all of Illinois. The most notorious of these was the lynching of Will James before a crowd of white spectators estimated at 10,000, in the county seat of Cairo, Illinois on November 11, 1909. James was accused of murdering a young white woman. Later that same evening, the mob lynched a white man named Henry Salzner, hanging him in the courthouse square for allegedly killing his wife. Neither man had had a trial, nor was anyone ever prosecuted for the lynchings, even though Illinois had passed an anti-lynching law four years earlier.

Geography
Its borders are partly defined by the Mississippi River and the Ohio River. The lowest point in the state of Illinois is located on the Mississippi River in Cairo in Alexander County, where it flows out of Illinois and into Kentucky.

Adjacent counties
 Union County - north
 Ballard County, Kentucky - southeast
 Pulaski County - east
 Mississippi County, Missouri - south
 Scott County, Missouri - west
 Cape Girardeau County, Missouri - northwest

National protected areas
 Cypress Creek National Wildlife Refuge (part)
 Shawnee National Forest (part)

Major highways
  Interstate 57
  U.S. Route 51
  U.S. Route 60
  U.S. Route 62
  Illinois Route 3
  Illinois Route 37
  Illinois Route 127
  Illinois Route 146

Climate and weather

Law enforcement
The Tamms Correctional Center, a now shuttered super-maximum correctional facility operated by the Illinois Department of Corrections, was located in Tamms, as was the State of Illinois execution chamber. Prior to the January 11, 2003 commutation of death row sentences, male death row inmates were housed in Tamms, Menard, and Pontiac correctional centers. After that date, only Pontiac continued to host the male death row. On January 4, 2013, after years of controversy over inmate conditions, the prison officially closed, negatively impacting the county's economy.

In late September 2009, press reports indicated that the Alexander County Sheriff's office had five of its seven squad cars repossessed as payments had not been made. The sheriff once had 29 deputies, but was reduced to just five at the time of the reports. The Illinois State Police have provided assistance to the county with additional patrols.

Demographics

As of the 2010 United States Census, there were 8,238 people, 3,329 households, and 2,093 families residing in the county. The racial makeup of the county was 60.9% white, 35.4% black or African American, 0.3% American Indian, 0.2% Asian, 0.1% Pacific islander, 1.4% from other races, and 1.7% from two or more races. Those of Hispanic or Latino origin made up 1.9% of the population. In terms of ancestry, 13.9% were German, 6.8% were Irish, 5.3% were English, and 4.7% were American.

Of the 3,329 households, 29.6% had children under the age of 18 living with them, 39.6% were married couples living together, 18.5% had a female householder with no husband present, 37.1% were non-families, and 33.6% of all households were made up of individuals. The average household size was 2.31 and the average family size was 2.94. The median age was 41.1 years.

The median income for a household in the county was $28,833 and the median income for a family was $44,699. Males had a median income of $35,880 versus $25,743 for females. The per capita income for the county was $15,858. About 11.8% of families and 20.1% of the population were below the poverty line, including 33.1% of those under age 18 and 14.7% of those age 65 or over.

2020 census
Between 2010 and 2020, the population of Alexander County decreased to 5,240.  The 36.4 percent decline was the largest of any of the 3,138 U.S. counties. Although the population of the county had been decreasing for decades, the closure of the Tamms Correctional Center in 2013 probably caused an acceleration of the decline in the 2010s.

Note: the US Census treats Hispanic/Latino as an ethnic category. This table excludes Latinos from the racial categories and assigns them to a separate category. Hispanics/Latinos can be of any race.

As of the 2020 United States census, there were 5,240 people, 2,154 households, and 1,357 families residing in the county.

Education
Here is a list of school districts with any territory in the county, no matter how slight, even if the schools and/or administrative offices are located in other counties:
 Cairo Unified School District 1
 Century Community Unit School District 100
 Egyptian Community Unit School District 5
 Meridian Community Unit School District 101
 Shawnee Community Unit School District 84

Communities

City
 Cairo (seat)

Villages
 East Cape Girardeau
 McClure
 Tamms
 Thebes

Census-designated place
 Olive Branch

Unincorporated communities

 Cache
 Clank
 Dawleys
 Diswood
 Elco
 Fayville
 Future City
 Gale
 Golden Lily
 Klondike
 Miller City
 Roth
 Sandusky
 Tankville
 Tatumville
 Unity
 Urbandale
 Willard

Forts
 Fort Defiance

Politics

Alexander County is unique among antebellum free state rural counties in having a postbellum political history largely determined by a previously disfranchised black electorate. It is most similar in this respect to – though still substantially different from – some counties of the south and the Eastern Shore of Maryland. The county was thus solidly Republican until the New Deal, and gradually turned solidly Democratic up through the presidency of Bill Clinton.

In the twenty-first century, the county has shown a trend towards the GOP due to large-scale black emigration and a rapid swing of its Caucasian population toward Republican candidates. This became clear in 2016, when Donald Trump carried the county by 8.3 points—a hard swing from favorite son Obama's 13.6-point victory four years earlier, and the first time the county voted Republican since 1972. An even harder swing was taken in 2020, when he carried Alexander again by 14.2 points, even as the nation as a whole trended slightly leftward. Furthermore, Dick Durbin lost the county in the simultaneous U.S. Senate election, making it his first Senate election in which he failed to win the county and the first Senate election since 1972 in which a Republican won the county.

Despite the rightward swing taken by the county, the city and county seat of Cairo remains overwhelmingly Democratic.

See also
 National Register of Historic Places listings in Alexander County, Illinois
List of counties in Illinois

References
Specific

General
 
 United States Census Bureau 2007 TIGER/Line Shapefiles
 United States Board on Geographic Names (GNIS)
 United States National Atlas

External links

 Rootsweb - Alexander County

  Alexander County Website

 
Illinois counties
1819 establishments in Illinois
Cape Girardeau–Jackson metropolitan area
Illinois counties on the Mississippi River
Illinois counties on the Ohio River
Southern Illinois
Populated places established in 1819